Peter Frilingos (1944–2004) was a sports journalist and commentator, best known for his work as a rugby league writer.

His reporting methods and integrity came under severe scrutiny during the Super League war. While he originally supported the ARL, he began openly endorsing Super League after a closed door meeting with News Limited management. This led to him being branded News Limited's "Chief Toady" by Media Watch.

He has an award named after him in the National Rugby League's Dally M Medal, called the 'Peter Frilingos Memorial Award'.

In August 2019, Frilingos was inducted into the National Rugby League Hall of Fame.

References

1944 births
Continuous Call Team
Australian rugby league commentators
Australian rugby league journalists
Australian people of Greek descent
2004 deaths